Maza may refer to:

People
Ada Maza (born 1958), Argentine politician
Alfredo del Mazo Maza (born 1975), Mexican politician
Ángel Maza (born 1954), Argentine politician
Antonio de la Maza (1912–1961), Dominican businessman and conspirator in the assassination of Rafael Trujillo
Bernardino Pérez Maza, Spanish basketball coach and player
Bob Maza (1939–2000), Australian actor and playwright
Carlos Maza, American journalist and video producer
Diana Maza (born 1984), Ecuadorian judoka
Domingo Maza Zavala (1922–2010), Venezuelan economist
Jason Maza (born 1987), English actor and producer
Jonathan Maza (born 1998), Argentine footballer
José Maza Fernández (1889–1964), Chilean politician, lawyer, and diplomat
José Maza Sancho (born 1948), Chilean astronomer and astrophysicist
José Manuel Maza (1951–2017), Spanish lawyer, criminologist and writer
Juan Agustín Maza (1784–1830), Argentine politician and lawyer
Liza Maza (born 1957), Filipina activist
Luis Maza (born 1980), Venezuelan baseball player
Manuel Vicente Maza (1779–1839), Argentine politician
Margarita Maza (1826–1871), First Lady of Mexico
María José Maza (born 1990), Ecuadorian model
Miguel Ángel Maza (born 1993), Spanish footballer
Miguel Maza Márquez (born 1937), Colombian general
Miller Maza, Nigerian Anglican bishop
Rachael Maza (born 1965), Australian actress
Roland de la Maza (born 1971), American baseball player
Ronny Maza (born 1997), Venezuelan footballer
Rubén Maza (born 1967), Venezuelan long-distance runner
Jackie Mason (born Yacov Moshe Maza, 1931), American comedian and actor
Francisco Javier Rodríguez (born 1981), Mexican football player, known as "Maza"
Regino Sainz de la Maza (1896–1981), Spanish guitarist

Places
Máza, a village in Baranya county, Hungary
Maza, Crete, a village on the Greek island of Crete
Maza, North Dakota, a city in Towner County

Food
Meze, an array of appetizers in Middle Eastern cuisine
A product made from kneaded barley dough in Ancient Greek cuisine

Other uses
108113 Maza, an asteroid named for José Maza Sancho
Elisa Maza, a fictional character in the Disney animated series Gargoyles
MazaCoin, a cryptocurrency
Maza language, a Lolo-Burmese language spoken by the Yi people of China
Maza of the Moon, a 1930 science fiction novel by Otis Adelbert Kline
"Maza", the 2021 single version of Inna's 2020 song "Maza Jaja"

See also
 Mazas, a surname